Nancy Torresen (born October 7, 1959) is a United States district judge of the United States District Court for the District of Maine. She is the first female judge to serve in the District of Maine.

Early life and education
Torresen received a Bachelor of Arts from Hope College in Holland, Michigan in 1981 and a Juris Doctor from the University of Michigan Law School in 1987.

Career
Torresen worked as a law clerk for then-District Judge Conrad K. Cyr from 1987 to 1988. Between the years 1988 to 1990, Torresen worked at the law firm of Williams & Connolly, where she was based in Washington, D.C. In 1990, Torresen joined the United States Attorney's Office in Maine, where she handled civil actions involving United States federal agencies. Between 1994 and 2001, Torresen worked for the appellate section of the criminal division of the Maine Attorney General’s Office, where she was responsible for representing the state of Maine in appeals of serious violent crime convictions. From 2001 until becoming a federal judge in 2011, she worked in the United States Attorney’s Office in Bangor and focused on investigating and prosecuting various federal crimes.

Federal judicial service
Torresen was nominated to fill the seat of Judge D. Brock Hornby by President Barack Obama on March 2, 2011. Torresen is the first woman to serve as a federal judge in Maine. The United States Senate confirmed Torresen on October 3, 2011. She received her judicial commission on October 4, 2011. She became Chief Judge on January 6, 2015. She ended her term as Chief Judge on December 31, 2018.

See also
List of first women lawyers and judges in Maine

References

External links

1959 births
Hope College alumni
Judges of the United States District Court for the District of Maine
Living people
People from Bangor, Maine
United States district court judges appointed by Barack Obama
21st-century American judges
University of Michigan Law School alumni
Assistant United States Attorneys
21st-century American women judges